Bernd Stelter (born 19 April 1961 in Unna) is a German comedian, a writer and a television presenter.

Life 
As a writer, Stelter has published several books. On German radio and television he has been working as comedian and  presenter. In the Cologne Carnival he is renowned for his comedy and his songs. Stelter lives in Bornheim.

Works

Books 
 2004: Nie wieder Ferienhaus
 2004: Das Leben ist zu kurz, um schlechten Wein zu trinken
 2008: Der Tod hat eine Anhängerkupplung: Ein Campingkrimi
 2011: Wer abnimmt, hat mehr Platz im Leben. Verlag: Bastei Lübbe (Lübbe Hardcover)

Carnival Songs 
 Ich hab drei Haare auf der Brust
 Das Lied vom Kaninchen
 Ein Bier im Keller
 Ma-hat-ma	
 Hörst du die Regenwürmer husten?

Filmography 
 7 Tage, 7 Köpfe
 Bernds Hexe
 Deutschland lacht
 NRW-Duell

External links 

 Official website of Bernd Stelter

References 

German male comedians
German television presenters
Living people
1961 births
People from Unna
German male writers
Westdeutscher Rundfunk people